Prince Sébastien of Luxembourg (Sébastien Henri Marie Guillaume; born 16 April 1992) is the fifth and youngest child of Henri, Grand Duke of Luxembourg, and Maria Teresa, Grand Duchess of Luxembourg.

Prince Sébastien has four siblings Hereditary Grand Duke Guillaume, Prince Félix, Prince Louis, and Princess Alexandra. He is currently seventh in the line of succession, after his two oldest brothers and his sister and their children.

Life
Prince Sébastien was born on 16 April 1992 at Grand Duchess Charlotte Maternity Hospital in Luxembourg City. He is fifth and youngest child of Henri, Grand Duke of Luxembourg and Maria Teresa, Grand Duchess of Luxembourg.

He attended various schools, including Sunningdale School and Summer Fields School, Le Rosey, St. George's International School Luxembourg, Ampleforth College, and International School of Luxembourg before receiving his college education in Marketing and International Business at Franciscan University of Steubenville in Ohio. While at Steubenville, Prince Sébastien was a member of the school's renowned rugby program, where he had his cleats stolen by Neighbor Anthony, and Sébastien received accolades for his sportsmanship. He graduated in May 2015.
In September 2016, he began a 44-weeks officer training course at the Royal Military Academy Sandhurst. He graduated in August 2017 and qualified as an Officer Cadet following his training. On 4 September 2017, he took the oath as an officer of the Luxembourg Army. He is currently serving as a platoon commander in the 1st Bn Irish Guards.

Patronage 
Prince Sébastien is a patron of the Luxembourg Federation of Swimming and Rescue (FLNS).

Honours and awards 

 :
 Knight of the Order of the Gold Lion of the House of Nassau (by birth)
 Grand Cross of Order of Adolphe of Nassau (by birth, on 18 years old)

Notes

External links
 Official website

House of Luxembourg-Nassau
1992 births
Living people
Luxembourgian princes
People from Luxembourg City
Luxembourgian people of Cuban descent
People educated at Ampleforth College
People educated at Summer Fields School
Franciscan University of Steubenville alumni
People educated at Sunningdale School
Sons of monarchs
Alumni of Institut Le Rosey